Dragon Ball GT: A Hero's Legacy, known in Japan as  is the only Dragon Ball GT television special, aired in Japan on March 26, 1997, between episodes 41 and 42. The events in this special are actually a prelude to events that take place at the very end of the last episode of the series. An English dub of the special was released on DVD by Funimation in the United States on November 16, 2004. It was re-released again on the second volume of the Funimation remastered DVDs. A second English dub that features an unknown cast was produced by AB Groupe/Bluewater and aired on Toonami UK under the title Four-star Dragonball Is The Proof of Courage.

Plot
100 years after Goku defeats Omega Shenron, all of his friends and family are now deceased except for his granddaughter, Pan, who is now elderly. She has a great-great grandson named Goku Jr., who closely resembles his great-great-great-great grandfather Goku, but lacks the latter's courage and fighting spirit. Pan takes Goku Jr. to the cemetery to pay their respects to her grandfather and tries to train him to be a warrior, but he has no confidence. At school, he is bullied by classmate Puck and his gang. Upset that Goku Jr. does not stand up for himself, Pan faints and is hospitalized. 

Goku Jr. recalls the story of the magical wish-granting Dragon Ball and hopes to use it to heal Pan. The next morning, he encounters Puck and his gang and reveals to them that he is going to Mount Paozu but is ridiculed. Angry, Goku Jr. unleashes some of his power and knocks out the bullies. After following the road for hours, a truck driver gives Goku Jr. a ride but later steals his belongings when he exits the truck to relieve himself. Goku Jr. encounters Puck yet again at a roadside grocery store, who agrees to accompany him so he can watch him be eaten by a monster at Mount Paozu. To acquire supplies for the long journey, Puck steals a cart full of food from the grocery store. Goku Jr. tells Puck about his quest to heal Pan, and though Puck doesn't believe in the Dragon Balls, he decides to help on the off chance it could work, saying he admired Pan's strength.  

After encountering and overcoming obstacles along the way, Goku Jr. and Puck are halted by a long wooden bridge which looks dangerously unstable. Puck crosses the bridge first, followed by Goku Jr. who crosses nervously and stumbles due to strong winds. Puck struggles to save Goku Jr., who dangles from a rope above the deep trench below. The bridge collapses, causing Puck to fall into the trench. Goku Jr. manages to cross the ravine and continues his journey alone.

After traveling another great distance, Goku Jr. encounters a hostile pig-like demon. A brown bear, thankful to Goku Jr. for helping her cub earlier, fights the demon. Goku Jr. becomes enraged and transforms into a Super Saiyan. He easily defeats the demon and passes out. When he comes to, he has no memory of the transformation. He then arrives to the summit of Mount Paozu, where he finds an old house. Inside, he discovers the four-star Dragon Ball and mistakenly believes that only one ball is needed to grant the wish. He tries and fails to make his wish to save Pan. In anger, he shouts at the Dragon Ball and throws the ball away. The Dragon Ball rolls to the feet of Goku Jr.'s ancestor, Goku, who explains that he has to collect all seven to make a wish. Goku informs his descendant that he is strong and brave despite what he thinks of himself. Suddenly, a helicopter descends with Pan and Puck inside. Goku Jr. becomes excited to see everyone alive and well, exclaiming that the Dragon Ball granted his wish. He turns to where Goku stood, and is stunned to see that he has vanished until Goku's voice tells him that it was actually his bravery that restored his grandma and Puck's life.

In a final farewell, Goku wishes Goku Jr. good luck who boards the helicopter with newfound strength and the four-star Dragon Ball.

Cast

Production 

 Directed by Osamu Kasai.
 Written by Akira Toriyama and Takao Koyama.
 Produced by Cindy Brennan Fukunaga and Gen Fukunaga.

Music
 Ending Themes: "Don't You See!" by Zard
 "Step into the Grand Tour" by Shorty the Man

See also

 "Dan Dan Kokoro Hikareteku"

Notes

References

External links

 
 

1997 television specials
Hero's Legacy, A
Funimation
Toei Animation television
1990s animated television specials
Japanese television specials